The Executive Council, also known as the Governor's Cabinet is the highest administrative decision-making authority in Rivers State. It is part of the executive branch which is the most influential branch of the state government. It comprises the governor, deputy governor, Secretary to the State Government, chief of staff, commissioners and special advisers. All of its members excluding the Deputy Governor are appointed by the Governor of Rivers State and confirmed by the House of the Assembly of the state.

The Executive Council is responsible for advising and assisting the Chief Executive in the performance of his or her official duties. Individuals who have been appointed to serve in the Council may also be dismissed or reappointed (to other posts) at will.

Current Cabinet

The current Cabinet is serving under Governor of Rivers State Ezenwo Wike who took office as governor on 29 May 2015.

See also
Governor of Rivers State

References

 
Rivers State